RTS Svet (Serbian Cyrillic: РТС СBEТ, or RTS WORLD (/); Satellite program of RTS (/ )) is a Serbian satellite television channel. It is operated by RTS.

Audience 
The channel is aimed at Serbs living abroad.

History 
The channel was banned by the satellite provider Eutelsat during the NATO conflict with Serbia in 1999.

References

External links

Television stations in Serbia
Television channels in North Macedonia
Television channels and stations established in 1991
Satellite television
International broadcasters
1991 establishments in Serbia